The 36th National Basketball Association All-Star Game was played on February 9, 1986, at Reunion Arena in Dallas. The coaches were K.C. Jones for the East, and Pat Riley for the West. The most valuable player was Isiah Thomas of the Detroit Pistons, who recorded 30 points, 10 assists and five steals.

Score by periods

Halftime: East, 69-66
Third quarter: West, 102-100

Rosters

DNP Michael Jordan and Patrick Ewing were unable to participate due to injury. Jordan and Ewing weren't replaced by anyone.
ST Eastern Conference head coach K.C. Jones chose Sidney Moncrief to start in place of the injured Jordan.

NBA All-Star Legends Classic
This game featured the East from the likes of Pete Maravich, Gail Goodrich, Bailey Howell, John Havlicek, Tom Sanders, Dave Cowens, Walt Bellamy, Connie Hawkins and Bob Cousy.
The west represents the likes of Zelmo Beaty, Calvin Murphy, Oscar Robertson, Elvin Hayes, Cazzie Russell, Randy Smith, Jack Marin, Nate Thurmond, Slater Martin and Tom Gola.

References

External links 
 1986 NBA All-Star Game

National Basketball Association All-Star Game
All-Star
Sports competitions in Texas